McLeod Country Golf Club is an 18-hole golf course located in Mount Ommaney, Brisbane, Queensland, Australia.

It was the first golf club in Australia to give women members equal rights to men, and is one of few golf clubs in the world managed entirely by female members.

History
The idea of a golf club where women would have equal rights as the men had been mooted since around 1963. Some years later, it was made known to Hilda Reid and Kathleen Atherton, who were members at Ashgrove Golf Club, that Centenary Estates were offering land for the development of a golf course.  They subsequently met with Mr Peter Lightfoot, general manager of Centenary Estates.  On 20 September 1968, Atherton signed an agreement on behalf of McLeod Country Golf Club to purchase the land for the price of $1; the sale was agreed on the provision that the buyers built the golf course. That one dollar note is now displayed in the foyer of the clubhouse. The initial nine-hole course was completed in 1972.

The name McLeod was used to honour Miss Gertrude McLeod, who had devoted her life to promoting women's golf in Queensland. She was president of the Queensland Ladies Golf Union for 30 years and president of the Australian Ladies Golf Union for five years.

See also

Golf in Australia
Sport in Queensland

References 

1968 establishments in Australia
Sports clubs established in 1968
Sports venues completed in 1968
Golf clubs and courses in Queensland
Sporting clubs in Brisbane